Simone Sereni (born 9 August 1968) is a retired Italian football midfielder.

References

1968 births
Living people
Italian footballers
ACF Fiorentina players
A.C. Trento 1921 players
U.S. Alessandria Calcio 1912 players
S.S. Arezzo players
Association football midfielders
Serie A players